Shirley Burman (born 1934) is a railroad photographer, historian of women's work in the railroad industry, and creator of the traveling photo exhibition, Women and the American Railroad.

Burman received a BA in Art from the University of California-Davis in 1972.  She was an illustrator for the California State Parks in 1974, and a documentary photographer for the U.S. federal government in 1976. She resumed employment with the California State Parks in 1978 as a photographer for the California State Railroad Museum's restoration projects.
  
Since 1983, Burman has been a self-employed railroad photographer and designer.  Together with her late husband, the railroad photographer Richard Steinheimer, she produced a book, Whistles Across the Land, in 1994. She lives in Sacramento, California.

Burman established a non-profit corporation called The Women's Railroad History Project. It is a repository for oral histories, photographic and artifact collections, and other historical research. Selections from Burman's international traveling exhibitions Women and the American Railroad TM were compiled into a 1995 wall calendar "Women and the American Railroad."

Publications

 Steinheimer, Richard, and Burman, Shirley, Whistles Across the Land: A Love Affair with Trains.  San Rafael, CA: CEDCO Publishing Company, 1993. .Sh
 Burman, Shirley. "Women and the American Railroad, a calendar for 1995." Cedco Publishing Company, San Rafael, CA, 1994. 
 Levinson, Nancy Smiler, and Burman, Shirley, She's Been Working on the Railroad.  New York: Dutton, 1997. .
 Burman, Shirley, "Women and the American Railroad - Documentary Photography," Journal of the West, April 1994, 36-41.

References

1934 births
Living people
20th-century American photographers
Rail transport photographers
University of California, Davis alumni
21st-century American photographers
20th-century American women photographers
21st-century American women photographers